Mohd Haizal Faquan Sadarudin (born 15 February 1991) is a Malaysian footballer. He currently played as a defender for DRB-Hicom F.C.

Starting his career at Perak youth system, he was in the Perak under-23 team that won 2012 Malaysia President Cup and 2012 King's Gold Cup. He was promoted to the senior team for the 2013 Malaysia Super League campaign. Due to injuries and suspensions to the senior players, Haizal made his league debut on 15 January 2013 in a match against Felda United FC.

Haizal's contract with Perak was terminated in early April 2014 due to long term injuries, which restricted his appearances to only one league game in the 2014 Super League season.

References

1991 births
Living people
Malaysian people of Malay descent
Malaysian footballers
Perak F.C. players
People from Ipoh
People from Perak
Association football defenders